NATV: Native American Television is an organization in the United States, providing news, education, and entertainment content to the  Native American community. Founded in 1990, the network is run and staffed by Native Americans and is  based in Williamsburg, Virginia.

NATV currently has programming online and distribution of select segments, special event coverage and programs available for channels which broadcast through cable and satellite in the US and Canada.

See also
 AIROS Native Radio Network

External links
 NATV organizational website

Native American history of Virginia
Native American television
Williamsburg, Virginia
Television channels and stations established in 1990